HSBC Bank Canada, formerly the Hongkong Bank of Canada (HBC), is a Canadian chartered bank and the Canadian subsidiary of British multinational banking and financial services company HSBC. HSBC Canada is the seventh largest bank in Canada, with offices in every province except Prince Edward Island, and is the largest foreign-owned bank in the country. The corporate headquarters are located at the HSBC Canada Building in the downtown core's financial district of Vancouver, British Columbia. HSBC Bank Canada's Institution Number (or bank number) is 016.

History

In 1979, The Hongkong and Shanghai Banking Corporation bought a Vancouver-based acceptance company that financed machinery and equipment for small companies operating in British Columbia. In 1981, The Hongkong and Shanghai Banking Corporation incorporated Hongkong Bank of Canada (HBC), in Vancouver as a chartered bank effective July 1, 1981, under the Bank Act of Canada using the acceptance company as a base for the new bank. HBC had a few retail branches primarily focused on Asian-Canadians whose primary business centred on commercial enterprises. HBC opened branches in major cities in western Canada and in Toronto and Montreal but growth was slow. HBC sought to grow by acquisition, but the first three attempts to buy an existing institution were unsuccessful.  HBC acquired the assets of Bank of British Columbia on November 27, 1986, which had essentially failed.  This acquisition gave HBC an additional $2.6 billion in assets and 41 branches in British Columbia and Alberta propelling it overnight from the 20th largest to 9th largest bank in Canada.

On May 20, 1988, HBC amalgamated with Midland Bank Canada, gaining many new corporate banking relationships, combined assets of $472 million, and expanding to Eastern Canada. It acquired Lloyds Bank Canada on May 29, 1990, thereby adding another $4.4 billion in assets and 53 branches.  Lloyds Bank had acquired Continental Bank of Canada in 1986. Continental Bank began in 1973 as Niagara Finance Company, later became IAC Limited, and then Continental Bank.

By October 31, 1990, HBC's assets were $10.2 billion and its branch network had doubled with most of its newly acquired branches located in Ontario and Quebec.  The acquisition of Lloyds also made the company Canada's largest foreign bank and a bilingual operation with branches in eight Quebec communities. On April 30, 1993, HBC acquired ANZ Canada consisting of one office in Toronto, which it combined with the existing HBC branch at 70 York Street. ANZ had acquired Grindlays Bank Canada with its 1984 acquisition of Grindlays Bank, but management sold the component to HBC to focus on expansion in the Asia-Pacific area.  The purchase of ANZ made HBC the seventh largest bank in Canada with branches in every province except Prince Edward Island.  HBC acquired the single-office Metropolitan Trust Company of Canada on August 1, 1995.

HBC acquired Barclays Bank Canada on August 31, 1996. Barclays had re-entered Canada in 1979 and developed a diversified but modest range of activities. In 1985, Barclays bought the assets of Wells Fargo Bank (Canada), consisting of its operations in Alberta and Florida, so that Wells Fargo could re-focus on its home market. In 1993, Barclays Bank Canada closed its Edmonton branch and the following year, it closed six additional branches in Vancouver, Calgary, Winnipeg, London, Montreal and Halifax, retaining only its head office. Barclays' Canadian operations lost approximately $120-million between 1992 and 1996.

In response to the growing north-south trade occasioned by the adoption of the 1994 North American Free Trade Agreement (NAFTA), HBC acquired the Seattle, Washington and Portland, Oregon branches of Marine Midland Bank in 1996.  This move into the United States seemed a natural expansion that followed the business interests of many of the bank's customers.  HBC acquired National Westminster Bank of Canada on May 1, 1998, which had assets of Can$844.5 million. NatWest had entered Canada in 1982. On June 21, 1999, HBC changed its name to HSBC Bank Canada, consistent with the HSBC Group's strategy of creating the global brand, HSBC. On December 3 of that year, it acquired Prenor Trust Company of Canada.

In 2000, HSBC Bank Canada acquired Republic National Bank of New York (Canada) after HSBC acquired the parent bank. Republic  had entered Canada in 1982, and was an amalgamation of several banks. Republic's purchases included Bank Leumi Le Israel (Canada) in 1993; Israel-based Bank Hapoalim (Canada) in 1994; and Israel Discount Bank of Canada's in 1996.  On April 1, 2001, HSBC Canada acquired CCF Canada after HSBC Holdings acquired CCF Canada's parent company, Crédit Commercial de France (CCF). CCF had just acquired Crédit Lyonnais Canada. Credit Commercial de France (Canada) had entered Canada in 1982 when it established an office in Montreal. Société Genérale (Canada) acquired it in 1990. CCF had returned to Canada in 2000. In 2002, HSBC Holdings merged its Canadian and US operations to create a North American transnational bank. HSBC Bank USA of New York, with assets of US$87 billion, and HSBC Canada, with assets of Can$34 billion, share some operating resources but remain separate units. On June 1, 2004, HSBC Bank Canada completed its acquisition of Intesa Bank's Canadian unit, which had 11 branches and total assets of Can$1.1 billion.

On September 20, 2011, HSBC Canada sold its full-service brokerage division, HSBC Securities (Canada) Inc., to National Bank Financial Group for Can$208 million.

In June 2015, Sandra Stuart was named president and CEO becoming the first woman to head a Canadian chartered bank.

In November 2022, HSBC announced the exit of Canadian market. Royal Bank of Canada will acquire 100% of the common shares of HSBC Canada for an all-cash purchase price of $13.5 billion, which is a multiple of 9.4 times HSBC Canada's estimated 2024 earnings. Completion of the transaction is expected by late 2023, subject to regulatory approvals. HSBC has been under pressure to cut costs and divest non-Asian businesses.

Operations and corporate structure

Operating divisions of HSBC:

 HSBC Investments (Canada)
 HSBC Capital (Canada)
 HSBC Trust Company (Canada)
 HSBC Securities (Canada), which includes a discount brokerage division called HSBC InvestDirect
 HSBC Insurance Agency (Canada)

Executives

 Linda Seymour, president and chief executive officer
 Larry Tomei, executive vice president of retail banking and wealth management
 Jason Henderson, executive vice president and managing director, head of global banking and markets
 Dan Hankinson, chief financial officer
 Sophia Tsui, chief risk officer
 Supreet Warna, Chief Administrative Officer

Membership
HSBC Canada is a member of the Canadian Bankers Association (CBA) and registered member with the Canada Deposit Insurance Corporation (CDIC), a federal agency insuring deposits at all of Canada's chartered banks. It is also a member of:

 Interac
 MasterCard
 Cirrus Network
 The Exchange

Effective March 15, 2010, BMO Bank of Montreal ceased accepting deposits at its ATMs from HSBC customers and resumed charging a convenience fee after five years of an ATM sharing agreement with HSBC Bank Canada. HSBC continues as a member of The Exchange Network.  This was a decision HSBC took as part of a restructuring of its personal banking strategy. Instead, HSBC will rebate the convenience fee charged to its HSBC Premier qualified customers to a maximum of $2.00 per instance for using any ATM in Canada.

Sponsorships
 Toronto Blue Jays Baseball Club
 Vancouver Canucks Hockey Club
 Calgary Flames Hockey Club
 MMICC - McGill Management International Case Competition in Montreal, QC
 Jetbridges at Toronto Pearson International Airport, Vancouver International Airport and Calgary International Airport

See also

 List of banks and credit unions in Canada

References

External links
Official site
HSBC site

Canada
Banks of Canada
Banks established in 1981
1981 establishments in British Columbia
Canadian subsidiaries of foreign companies
Canadian brands
Companies based in Vancouver